Meucci is a surname of Italian origin that may refer to:

Antonio Meucci (1808–1889), Italian-American inventor sometimes credited with invention of the telephone
Attilio Meucci (born 1970), Italian mathematician and financial engineer
Daniele Meucci (born 1985), Italian long-distance runner
Michaelangelo Meucci (1840–1890), Italian painter
Vincenzo Meucci (1694–1766), Italian late-Baroque painter

See also
Garibaldi-Meucci Museum

Italian-language surnames